The Flechado Formation is a geologic formation in the northern Sangre de Cristo Mountains of New Mexico. It preserves fossils dating back to the early to middle Pennsylvanian.

Description
The Flechado Formation consists of low-feldspar sandstone and shale alternating with thin beds of limestone. It overlies the Tererro Formation and is overlain by the Alamitos Formation. The formation is well to extremely well cemented in the type area, so that it can be difficult to distinguish from the Precambrian Ortega Formation.

The terrigenous sediments of the Flechado Formation were likely derived from the southern part of Uncompahgre uplift during uplift on the west side of the Picuris-Pecos fault.

Fossils
Atokan (lower Moscovian) fusulinids and
brachiopods are found in the lower part, which also contains broken crinoid, bryozoan, and algal remains.

History of investigation
The formation was first described by P.K. Sutherland in 1963.

See also

 List of fossiliferous stratigraphic units in New Mexico
 Paleontology in New Mexico

Footnotes

References
 
 
 

Carboniferous formations of New Mexico
Carboniferous southern paleotropical deposits